Eslamabad-e Qeshlaq (also Romanized as Eslāmābād-e Qeshlāq; also known as Eslāmābād) is a village in Cheshmeh Saran Rural District, Cheshmeh Saran District, Azadshahr County, Golestan Province, Iran. At the 2006 census, its population was 91, in 26 families.

References 

Populated places in Azadshahr County